Eilema terminalis is a moth of the subfamily Arctiinae. It is found in India (Sikkim).

References

External links 
 Natural History Museum Lepidoptera generic names catalog

terminalis